The term sustainable society can refer to:

 An ecologically literate society.
 A society rooted in environmentalism, nonviolence, social justice, and grassroots, an aim of green politics. 
 A society striving for sustainability.

Related terms  
 Sustainable city
 Sustainable design
 Sustainable Society Index
 Sustainable living